Oguzoeme Nsenu (born 5 March 1958) is a Nigerian sprinter. She competed in the women's 100 metres at the 1980 Summer Olympics.

References

1958 births
Living people
Athletes (track and field) at the 1980 Summer Olympics
Nigerian female sprinters
Olympic athletes of Nigeria
Place of birth missing (living people)
Olympic female sprinters
20th-century Nigerian women